The Sarvottam Jeevan Raksha Padak is a civilian lifesaving award presented by the Government of India. Established on 30 September 1961, the award was originally called the Jeevan Raksha Padak, Class I.

Criteria
The Sarvottam Jeevan Raksha Padak is awarded to civilians to reward saving lives from drowning, fire, or mine accidents. It is awarded; "for conspicuous courage under circumstances of very great danger to the life of the rescue."

The Sarvottam Jeevan Raksha Padak may be awarded to members of the armed forces, police, or fire services when recognizable acts take place outside beyond the course of their duty. Subsequent awards are recognized by the addition of a medal bar to the ribbon. The medal may be awarded posthumously.

Appearance
The Sarvottam Jeevan Raksha Padak is a circular gold medal  in diameter. On the obverse in the centre is an open hand in the Abhayamudra pose with Ma Bhai above and Sarvottam Jeevan Rakash Padak below in Devanagri script. The reverse bears the Emblem of India and the motto Satyameva Jayate.

At the edges are light blue stripes and a single green centre stripe of green. These colors are meant to represent fire (red), water (blue), and life (green).

References

External links

Civil awards and decorations of India
Courage awards
Awards established in 1961
1961 establishments in India